Alejandro Guzmán (born 11 January 1941) is a Peruvian former footballer. He competed in the men's tournament at the 1960 Summer Olympics.

References

External links
 
 
 

1941 births
Living people
Footballers from Lima
Peruvian footballers
Peru international footballers
Olympic footballers of Peru
Footballers at the 1960 Summer Olympics
Association football forwards
Club Universitario de Deportes footballers
Sporting Cristal footballers